Windjammer is a 1958 documentary film that recorded a  voyage of the Norwegian sail training ship Christian Radich. Windjammer was produced by Louis de Rochemont and directed by Louis de Rochemont III. It was the only film to be shot in the widescreen Cinemiracle process, which came with a seven-track stereophonic soundtrack.

Filming
The Christian Radich and its Norwegian crew were filmed while sailing from Oslo, via the island of Madeira, across the Atlantic to the Caribbean, to New York City, Portsmouth, New Hampshire, and then back home to Bergen in Norway.

The film features a score by Morton Gould, with additional musical performances by cellist Pablo Casals and Arthur Fiedler conducting the Boston Pops Orchestra.

A musical highlight through the film is the Piano Concerto of Edvard Grieg, which accompanies the voyage narrative about one of the sea-cadets who is a piano-student preparing to play the concerto in Boston.

The film also features a meeting with the German ship Pamir, which sank in a hurricane in September 1957.

Presentation
The world premiere was on April 8, 1958, at Grauman's Chinese Theatre, Hollywood, where the movie ran for 36 weeks. The film was also exhibited at specially equipped cinemas in America, Canada, and Europe. Later it was shown in wide release in Cinerama theaters worldwide. It was particularly popular in the Scandinavian nations and in its 29-week run in Oslo had more paid admissions (401,320) than the city's population at the time (375,000).

The film begins in non-widescreen format (1.33: 1 aspect ratio) as the crew prepares for the voyage. When the ship finally sets out (about fifteen minutes into the picture), the screen expands to Cinemiracle dimensions, virtually the same as those of Cinerama.

Cast
 Niels Arntsen, First officer
 Erik Bye, Narrator
 Pablo Casals, Himself
 Arthur Fiedler, Himself
 Gunnulv Hauge, Doctor
 Nils Hermansen, Chief engineer
 Yngvar Kjelstrup, Captain
 Sven Erik Libaek, Cadet #35
 Harald Tusberg, Cadet #32

See also
 List of American films of 1958
Windjammer

References

Bibliography

External links
Good site with extensive coverage of the movie

1958 adventure films
1958 documentary films
1958 films
American documentary films
Documentary films about water transport
Sailing films
1950s English-language films
1950s American films